2 Chronicles 1 is the first chapter of the Second Book of Chronicles the Old Testament of the Christian Bible or of the second part of the Books of Chronicles in the Hebrew Bible. The book is compiled from older sources by an unknown person or group, designated by modern scholars as "the Chronicler", and had the final shape established in late fifth or fourth century BCE. This chapter belongs to the section focusing on the kingship of Solomon (2 Chronicles 1 to 9). The focus of this chapter is Solomon's ascension and wealth.

Text
This chapter was originally written in the Hebrew language and is divided into 17 verses in Christian Bibles, but into 18 verses in the Hebrew Bible with the following verse numbering comparison:

This article generally follows the common numbering in Christian English Bible versions, with notes to the numbering in Hebrew Bible versions.

Textual witnesses
Some early manuscripts containing the text of this chapter in Hebrew are of the Masoretic Text, which includes the Aleppo Codex (10th century) and Codex Leningradensis (1008).

There is also a translation into Koine Greek known as the Septuagint, made in the last few centuries BCE. Extant ancient manuscripts of the Septuagint version include Codex Vaticanus (B; B; 4th century), and Codex Alexandrinus (A; A; 5th century).

Old Testament references
: ; ; .
:

Solomon's sacrifice and prayer at Gibeon (1:1–13)
The section records how Solomon began his reign to succeed David in the unified monarchy as David had consolidated domestic support for Solomon (1 Chronicles 25–29). In verses 3–5, the Chronicler attempts to unite all legitimate worship sites and objects, that is the tabernacle built by Moses in the desert, which was placed in Gibeon (21:29), and the ark of the Covenant, placed in the tent by David in Jerusalem. The reference to a promise of an eternal dynasty made to David ('let your promise to my father David now be fulfilled'; cf. ) refers to verse 1 where Solomon is introduced as David's son and rightful successor by divine choice.

Verse 3
So Solomon, and all the congregation with him, went to the high place that was at Gibeon; for there was the tabernacle of the congregation of God, which Moses the servant of the Lord had made in the wilderness.
"High place": or "Place for worship"

Solomon's wealth (1:14–17)
The record of Solomon's wealth in this section is almost identical to other passages. Here is to illustrate the fulfillment of God's promise to Solomon in Gibeon.

Verse 17
And they fetched up, and brought forth out of Egypt a chariot for six hundred shekels of silver, and a horse for an hundred and fifty: and so brought they out horses for all the kings of the Hittites, and for the kings of Syria, by their means.
 "600 shekel of silver": about 15 pounds, or 6.9 kilograms.
 "Shekel": about 2/5 ounce or 11 grams
 "150" (shekel of silver): about 3¾ pounds, or 1.7 kilograms.
 "By their means": literally "by their hands"

See also

Related Bible parts: Genesis 28, Exodus 40, 1 Kings 3, 1 Kings 10, Psalm 45, Psalm 72, 1 Chronicles 16, 1 Chronicles 29

Notes

References

Sources

External links
 Jewish translations:
 Divrei Hayamim II - II Chronicles - Chapter 1 (Judaica Press) in Hebrew and English translation [with Rashi's commentary] at Chabad.org
 Christian translations:
 Online Bible at GospelHall.org (ESV, KJV, Darby, American Standard Version, Bible in Basic English)
 2 Chronicles Chapter 1. Bible Gateway

01